Alexon Group plc was an clothing retailer, based in Luton, England. The company was listed on the London Stock Exchange (symbol AXN). It was an constituent of the FTSE Fledgling Index.

The group owned eight brands, which are available in more than 990 outlets around the United Kingdom and Europe, as well as online. These brands serve specific segments of the market, offering co ordinated fashion ranges to women, whom appreciate classical styling and quality. Ruth Henderson was CEO of Alexon, at the time the only women to head a major public listed company in the UK.

Since 2012, Alexon has been owned by the Jacques Vert group, which was formed by the merger of Jacques Vert and Alexon. In 2014, the Alexon brand was dropped.

Brands
Alexon
Ann Harvey
Dash
Eastex
 Style Group - owners of Envy (sold 2008 to John Kinnaird)
Kaliko
Minuet Petite
Bay Trading Co.

References

Companies based in Luton
Clothing retailers of England
Clothing companies of England